The first season of The Masked Singer Brasil premiered on August 10, 2021 on TV Globo. On October 19, 2021 during the season finale episode, singer Priscilla Alcantara as "Unicórnio" won the competition and took home the grand prize of R$100.000. Actor Nicolas Prattes as "Monstro" finished as runner-up, while actress Cris Vianna as "Arara" and actress Jéssica Ellen as "Gata Espelhada" came in third and fourth place, respectively.

In October 2021, TV Globo renewed the show for a second season which was set to premiere in January 2022.

Production
Filming for the season occurred from July 23 to August 19, 2021 at WTC Events Center in São Paulo.

Hosts and panelists
Singer Ivete Sangalo serves as host, while Camila de Lucas serves as a backstage interviewer. The panelists consists of actor Rodrigo Lombardi, actress Taís Araújo, singer Simone Mendes and comedian Eduardo Sterblitch.

Guest panelists

Contestants

Episodes

Week 1 (August 10)

Week 2 (August 17)

Week 3 (August 24)

Week 4 (August 31)

Week 5 (September 14)

Week 6 (September 21)
Monstro's non-competitive performance did not air on television during the show's original broadcast, but was later released online exclusively on Globoplay and YouTube.

Week 7 (September 28)

Week 8 (October 5) – Semifinals

Week 10 (October 19) – Finals

Ratings and reception

Brazilian ratings
All numbers are in points and provided by Kantar Ibope Media.

Note: Episode 9 was a special recap episode.

References

External links
 The Masked Singer Brasil Gshow.com

2021 Brazilian television seasons
The Masked Singer Brasil